Crimson Hexagon was an AI-powered consumer insights company based out of Boston, Massachusetts. The company also had a European office in London, England. The company and its nearest competitor, Brandwatch, merged in 2018, with the new company taking the name Brandwatch. 

The company's online data library consisted of over 1 trillion publicly available posts, and includes documents from social networks such as Twitter, Instagram and Facebook as well as blogs, forums, and news sites. The company's ForSight platform, still available to Crimson Hexagon customers post-merger, is a Twitter Certified Product.

Crimson Hexagon's analysis of current events and trending topics was often featured in news articles. Pew Research used Crimson Hexagon's social media analysis platform to analyze media coverage and discourse.

History
Crimson Hexagon was founded in 2007 by Gary King and Candace Fleming based upon technology King developed at Harvard University’s Institute for Quantitative Social Science. In 2012, Stephanie Newby became the company's CEO.

In March 2014, the company announced its Affinities feature, which allows marketers to identify the interests of people talking about brands, products, or companies on social media.

On September 5, 2018, Crimson Hexagon released the industry's first reverse image search technology.

On October 4, 2018 Crimson Hexagon announced it was merging with Brandwatch.

References

External links
 Crimson Hexagon home page

Social media companies
Companies based in Boston
Technology companies established in 2007